Events in the year 1147 in Norway.

Incumbents
 Monarchs – Sigurd II Haraldsson, Eystein II Haraldsson, Inge I Haraldsson and Magnus Haraldsson

Events
Eystein II of Norway becomes King of Norway alongside his brothers.

Arts and literature

Births
Haakon II of Norway, King (died 1162).

Deaths

References

Norway